The Actus pontificum Cenomannis in urbe degentium ("Acts of the bishops dwelling in the city of Le Mans") is a series of short biographies of the Bishops of Le Mans, starting with the first legendary bishop Julian, one of the Seventy Disciples. The core text was written in the middle ninth century, probably by a cleric or clerics of the cathedral of Le Mans, though it had several subsequent continuations into the High Middle Ages. Much of the information this core contains, including several charters and diplomas, is partly or wholly fictitious. 

The Actus were probably part of an ambitious campaign to extend the bishop's rights over neighbouring monasteries, particularly the Benedictine abbey of Saint-Calais, though the attempt collapsed at the royal council of Verberie in 863. The text is important as evidence for late Carolingian episcopal ideology.

See also
Catholic Church in France

References

English-language discussion of the text can be found in W. Goffart, The Le Mans forgeries : a chapter from the history of church property in the ninth century  (Cambridge, Mass, 1966).
The best and most recent edition of the Actus and related texts, superseding all previous, is M. Weidemann, Geschichte des Bistums Le Mans von der Spätantike bis zur Karolingerzeit : Actus Pontificum Cenomannis in urbe degentium und Gesta Aldrici (Mainz, 2000).

9th-century Latin books
9th-century Christian texts
9th-century history books
Latin biographies
Writers from the Carolingian Empire